This is the discography of Apple Records, a record label formed by the Beatles in 1968. During its early years, the label enjoyed a fair degree of commercial success, most notably with Mary Hopkin and Badfinger, as well as discovering acts such as James Taylor and Billy Preston who would go on to greater success with other labels. However, by the mid-1970s, Apple had become little more than an outlet for the Beatles' solo recordings (although, as the solo Beatles were actually still under contract to EMI, the Apple label was, in truth, only a cosmetic addition to their releases). After EMI's contract with the Beatles ended in 1976, the Apple label was finally wound up. The label was reactivated in the 1990s with many of the original Apple albums being reissued on compact disc, and the company now oversees new Beatles releases such as the Anthology and 1 albums as well as the 2009 Beatles remastering programme. In 2010, Apple set about remastering and reissuing its back catalogue for a second time.

For convenience, releases are divided into UK and US releases. However, some releases which were designated a UK-sequence catalogue number were only issued in certain mainland European countries. Additionally, with the Beatles still being under contract to EMI, all of the group's records (and the majority of their UK solo releases) retained the numbering systems of Parlophone (for the UK, New Zealand and South Africa), Capitol (for the US) and EMI (for Australia). The Republic of Ireland released eight Apple singles in 1970–71, six of which had unique catalogue numbers. Since the 2013 takeover of EMI by Universal Music, the titles have yet to be reissued with Universal catalogue numbers and UPCs.

Singles

Not planned for release. A special recorded "message" medley from Frank Sinatra to Maureen Starkey. One single-sided single pressed and the master tape has been destroyed.
 Early UK editions credited to 'White Trash'. 
 Only released in Italy – 17.01.69.  
 Not given a full release, as EMI would not distribute. Only 2000 copies were pressed in the UK. An unnumbered US Apple acetate also exists.  
 Only released in France – 07.03.69. 
 Only released in Europe and Japan – 18.07.69.  
 Mail order only EP featuring: The Iveys "Storm in a Teacup" / James Taylor "Something's Wrong" / Jackie Lomax "Little Yellow Pill" / Mary Hopkin "Pebble and the Man".
 Not issued. Planned release date – 19.09.69.  APPLE 16 was also allocated to Mortimer's unreleased recording of "On Our Way Home". 
 Not issued. Planned release date - .12.69. 
 Not issued in UK.  Issued as APPLE 28 in some European countries. 
 Issued as APPLE 27 in some European countries. 
 Not issued. 
 Not issued in UK. Planned release date for Lennon – 5.12.72.
 Cancelled release. Made it only to the acetate stage. Planned release date – 24.9.73. 
 Re-issued with "Let Me Roll It" as the B side on 18.02.74. 
 Re-issued on 07.02.75 (UK) and 20.02.75 (US) with the same catalogue numbers but with the A and B sides reversed. 
 Released as part of a series of EMI "Golden 45's". 
 Four track EP featuring: Mary Hopkin "Those Were The Days" / Billy Preston "That's the Way God Planned It" / Jackie Lomax "Sour Milk Sea" / Badfinger "Come and Get It".
 Re-issued from 1975 with the same catalogue number (and sometimes artwork) on Capitol after McCartney's contract moved from Parlophone.  
 Re-issued with the same catalogue number on the Parlophone label. 
 Originally issued on Parlophone. 
 Double A Side. 
 Released on Parlophone before the establishment of Apple Records (New Zealand). 
 Originally released APon green vinyl and reissued on black vinyl. 
 Some issues list "McCartney's Wings". 
 Released as a 7" 45rpm and a 10" 78rpm. 
 Demo copies have the tracks "Band On The Run" (Edited Version) / "Band On The Run" (Full Version). 
 Also released as a double A side and with reversed A and B side. 
 Released in "East Asia" (Hong Kong) by Parlophone, Catalogue number PEA-501. 
 Released in "East Asia" (Hong Kong) by Parlophone, Catalogue number PEA-502. 
 Due to extreme demands on production, EMI also contracted Decca and Philips to press this release. 
 Due to extreme demands on production, EMI also contracted Philips to press this release. 
 Due to industrial action, EMI also contracted Decca to press this release. 
 Originally planned for release with flipped sides. 
 Released in Japan as AR-2520 on 05.06.70. 
 Released in several European countries in early February 1972. 
 Released in Sweden in December 1968 and Norway in April 1969 as SD 6061.  
 Released in the Philippines as AL 60838. 
 Released in several European countries in March 1975. 
 Released in France as APF 506.

Albums

 Not released. Planned release date – 30.05.69.  Later issued on Elektra Records as Accept No Substitute. SAPCOR 7 was also earmarked for a 20.06.69 album release by Trash.  
 Not issued in the UK. Planned release date – 04.07.69. Only released in Germany, Italy and Japan (with alternate catalogue numbers). 
 Regular album release to replace the Box Set package which accompanied the original UK issue. 
 From Then to You and The Beatles Christmas Album are the same album, being a collection of the Beatles Fan Club-only Christmas flexi discs issued between 1963 and 1969.  Similarly, these two albums were only available to members of "The Beatles Fan Club". 
 Only issued in mono despite stereo 'SW' prefix on US release. This album had previously been issued in full on Philles Records in the US and has since been reissued many times on various labels.
 Released in Brazil in mono without the 'S' prefix. 
 Planned for release in Brazil in mono without the 'S' prefix but only released in stereo. 
 Reissued on vinyl 10.12.96 with "Do You Mind" bonus track. Released in New Zealand as SAPCOR 101. 
 This album has since been reissued on various labels. 
 This album was reissued in 1977 on Ring O'Records, Catalogue number 2320 104, with different artwork. 
 Tetragrammaton catalogue number as EMI refused to distribute. 
 Later re-issued on EMI's Music for Pleasure label in the UK with a different catalogue number: Mind Games (MFP 5058) in 1980, Ringo (MFP 50508) in 1980, Dark Horse (MFP 50510) in 1980, Rock 'n' Roll (MFP 50522) in 1981, and Blast from Your Past (MFP 50524) in 1981. 
 Later re-issued on EMI's Fame label in the UK with a different catalogue number: Wild Life (FA 3101) in 1984,  Red Rose Speedway (FA 3193) in 1987. 
 Originally planned for release as STAP-01. 
 Pressed in the UK for export only, not released in the UK. 
 This is the cassette release of the Dutch LP with catalogue number 5C 052-93536.

Zapple Records

Zapple was a short-lived subsidiary of Apple designed to release spoken word and avant garde recordings.

 Not released by Zapple. Released by Harvest Records in 1973 (ST-424) and on CD by Collectors' Choice Music in 2005 (CCM-540-2).

Reissues

1990s remasters
Apple began the process of reissuing the back catalogue on compact disc in 1991, with many of the CDs containing bonus tracks.  By this time, the releases in the UK and US were virtually identical. This list does not include Beatles or solo albums, which were re-released on compact disc by Parlophone or Capitol.

2009 remasters
2009 saw the remastered reissues of the Beatles back catalogue.  A worldwide release date of 9 September 2009 (09.09.09) was set to tie in with the release of The Beatles: Rock Band music video game.  Replacing the CD editions which had been issued in 1987, all of the original Beatles albums were reissued in new packaging with mini DVD documentaries and, unlike the 1987 issues, the first four albums (Please Please Me, With The Beatles, A Hard Day's Night and Beatles For Sale) were made available on CD in stereo for the first time.  Also, the Past Masters collection of non-album material was now issued as a double CD set, as opposed to the two separate discs issued in 1988.  In addition, two box sets were issued, one containing all 16 remastered stereo albums and a second limited edition box set containing the mono mixes of all the albums up to and including The Beatles (the later albums did not receive a separate mono mix). The stereo box also features a DVD "The Mini Documentaries" which contains all the short films that are on the CDs in CD-ROM format.

Although the Apple logo is shown on all the 2009 remasters, the labels on the actual discs are those that appeared on the original LPs. So all the albums from "Please Please Me" through "Sgt. Pepper's Lonely Hearts Club Band" feature a Parlophone label. "Magical Mystery Tour", which was first released in an album version in the US, has a Capitol label. The remaining albums, originally released on Apple, feature the green "A-side" label, excepting "The Beatles" which features the green "A-side" label on disc 1, and the 'white' (cut apple) "B-side" label on disc 2. For the "Past Masters" double-CD set, the first disc has a Parlophone label, and the second disc a green "A-side" Apple label. The DVD that accompanies "The Beatles in Stereo" box set has a red Apple label (similar to that on the original US "Let It Be" LP).

In late 2010, the compilation albums 1962–1966 and 1967–1970 were issued again, in addition a box set "1962–1970" containing both sets, released in the UK and Europe, and a similar box set released in the US with added photo cards and a stamp. Shortly afterwards, the entire remastered catalogue was finally made available to download on iTunes after years of legal wrangling between the Beatles and Apple Inc.

  Also available as a USB flash drive.  Issued 07.12.09.

2010 remasters
With the 1990s reissues out of print, many of the original Apple albums were re-released for a second time in new remastered versions in October 2010.  These remasters were also made available on iTunes, just a few weeks before the Beatles back catalogue was finally released for download.  Several of the iTunes versions included exclusive tracks not available on the standard CD issue, although these tracks were included on a bonus double CD as part of the Apple Box Set, which collected all of the remastered albums in one package.  All of the 2010 remasters had been previously issued in the 1990s reissue programme apart from a 21-track compilation entitled  Come and Get It: The Best of Apple Records  which included a number of single-only tracks which now received their first official release on compact disc.

See also

 Apple Records
 List of record labels

References

External link
 Official site

Discography
Discographies of British record labels